Miroslav Gálik (born 24 July 1990) is a Slovak footballer who currently plays for DOXXbet liga club FK Dukla Banská Bystrica as a right back.

Club career

FK Dukla Banská Bystrica
Gálik made his professional Fortuna Liga's debut for FK Dukla Banská Bystrica on 28 February 2015 against FK AS Trenčín.

References

External links
 Eurofotbal profile
 
 Futbalnet profile

1990 births
Living people
Slovak footballers
Association football defenders
FK Dukla Banská Bystrica players
MŠK Novohrad Lučenec players
MŠK Rimavská Sobota players
Slovak Super Liga players